Clifford Porter Hall (September 19, 1888 – October 6, 1953) was an American character actor known for appearing in a number of films in the 1930s and 1940s. Hall typically played villains or comedic incompetent characters.

Early years
Hall was born in Cincinnati, Ohio. His father, W. A. Hall, headed a cooperage business that ended because of prohibition in the United States. After graduating from the University of Cincinnati, Hall worked for the Fleischmann Company while also directing and acting in little theater productions in Cleveland.

Career
Hall began his career touring as a stage actor with roles in productions of The Great Gatsby and Naked in 1926.  His Broadway credits included  The Great Gatsby (1926), Naked (1926), Loud Speaker (1927), Night Hostess (1928), It's a Wise Child (1929), Collision (1932), The Warrior's Husband (1932), The Dark Tower (1933), The Red Cat (1934).

Hall made his film debut in the 1931 drama Secrets of a Secretary.  His last onscreen appearance was in the 1954 film Return to Treasure Island, which was released after his death.
 
Hall was probably best remembered for five roles:  a senator in Mr. Smith Goes to Washington; an atheist in Going My Way; the nervous, ill-tempered Granville Sawyer, who administers a psychological test to Kris Kringle in Miracle on 34th Street; a train passenger who encounters a man (Fred MacMurray) who has just committed a murder in Double Indemnity; and the title character's lawyer (Herbert MacCaulay) in The Thin Man.

Personal life
Hall married actress Geraldine Brown in 1927; they had two children. He served as a deacon at First Presbyterian Church of Hollywood for many years.

On October 6, 1953, Hall died of a heart attack in Los Angeles, California, at the age of 65. His interment was at Forest Lawn - Hollywood Hills Cemetery.

In popular culture
Director Russ Meyer named one of the characters in the 1970 cult film Beyond the Valley of the Dolls after Hall.

Complete filmography

References

External links
 
 
 
 

1888 births
1953 deaths
20th-century American male actors
American male film actors
American male radio actors
American male stage actors
American male television actors
American Presbyterians
Burials at Forest Lawn Memorial Park (Hollywood Hills)
Male actors from Cincinnati